Guardian Royal Exchange Assurance plc was a large British insurance company. It was listed on the London Stock Exchange and was a constituent of the FTSE 100 Index.

History
The company was established through the merger of the Guardian Assurance Company and Royal Exchange Assurance in 1968.

In February 1998 it acquired PPP Healthcare, a private healthcare insurer, for £435m.

In February 1999 it was acquired by Axa of France for $5.7bn and integrated into its Sun Life & Provincial Holdings division. It was subsequently announced that the company would move out of the Royal Exchange Building. The life assurance business was acquired by Aegon later that year.

References

External links
Axa PPP Healthcare - Health Insurance

Insurance companies of the United Kingdom
Financial services companies based in London
Financial services companies established in 1968
Financial services companies disestablished in 1999
Companies formerly listed on the London Stock Exchange
Axa